The Catalan motorcycle Grand Prix is a motorcycling event held at the Circuit de Barcelona-Catalunya in Barcelona, Catalonia, Spain, as part of the Grand Prix motorcycle racing season. Between 2022 and 2026, Circuit de Barcelona-Catalunya is due to host at least three Grands Prix.

Official names and sponsors
1996–2003: Gran Premi Marlboro de Catalunya
2004–2005: Gran Premi Gauloises de Catalunya
2006–2009: Gran Premi Cinzano de Catalunya
2010–2013: Gran Premi Aperol de Catalunya
2014–present: Gran Premi Monster Energy de Catalunya

Winners of the Catalan motorcycle Grand Prix

Multiple winners (riders)

Multiple winners (manufacturers)

Multiple winners (countries)

By year

References

 
Recurring sporting events established in 1996
1996 establishments in Spain